Rui Ninnian Saldanha (born 21 October 1947) is a British field hockey player. He competed in the men's tournament at the 1972 Summer Olympics.

Saldanha, originally from Nairobi, Kenya, graduated from Durham University (Hatfield College) with a degree in Economics and Psychology in 1971 – his academic finals having been delayed for one year because of his commitments with the England hockey team and his election as President of the Durham University Athletic Union (DUAU). 

Before applying to Hatfield College Saldanha spent one year as a student at London Hospital Medical College.

Personal
In May 1989, Saldanha, now working for the New York Life Insurance Company at their office in Des Moines, Iowa, married Indian actress and former Miss India Persis Khambatta at the Polk County Courthouse.

References

External links
 

1947 births
Living people
British male field hockey players
Olympic field hockey players of Great Britain
Field hockey players at the 1972 Summer Olympics
Place of birth missing (living people)
Alumni of Hatfield College, Durham
Alumni of the London Hospital Medical College